The 1952 Wyoming Cowboys football team was an American football team that represented the University of Wyoming as a member of the Skyline Conference during the 1952 college football season. In their sixth and final season under head coach Bowden Wyatt, the Cowboys compiled a 5–4 record (4–3 against Skyline opponents), finished fourth in the conference, and outscored opponents by a total of 114 to 102.

In January 1953, Bowden Wyatt resigned as Wyoming's head football coach to accept the same post at the University of Arkansas. In six years at Wyoming, Wyatt compiled a 39–17–1 record. He was posthumously inducted into the College Football Hall of Fame as a coach in 1997.

Schedule

References

Wyoming
Wyoming Cowboys football seasons
Wyoming Cowboys football